Compass Box is a producer, bottler and marketer of a range of blended Scotch whiskies. The company is headquartered in Chiswick. Compass Box Whisky was founded in 2000 by American entrepreneur John Glaser, a former marketing director at Johnnie Walker. Blenders for Compass Box are Jill Boyd and James Saxon.

The company's whiskymakers select distillates from a number of existing Scotch whisky distilleries, with the selected whiskies then being blended together and the resulting blend matured further.

Products
Compass Box's main product line, called the Signature Range, consists of whiskies named 'The Spice Tree', 'The Peat Monster', 'Oak Cross', and 'Hedonism'. Outside the Signature Range, they produce a range of Blended Scotch whiskies called 'Great King Street', within which there are two products: 'Artist's Blend' (a rich, round, fruity blend) and 'Glasgow Blend' (a bold, smoky, sherried whisky made in the style historically favoured by Glaswegians).

This whiskeymaker has sold Limited Edition whiskies such as 'Optimism', 'The General', 'The Lost Blend', 'Morpheus', the 'Canto Cask' series and the three-bottle 'Myths and Legends'. Compass Box has worked with restaurants, bars, and bartenders to produce the range.  'Juveniles' was blended with restaurateur Tim Johnston to favour the tastes of the classic French cuisine of Parisian bistro Juveniles Bistrot à Vins. 'Delilah's' was created in partnership with Chicago punk bar owner Mike Miller. London bartender Rosey Mitchell created 'The Circle' with Compass Box whiskymakers.

Apart from whiskies, Compass Box also produces 'Orangerie', made from whisky infused with orange zest and spices.

Contravention of Scotch Whisky Association regulations

In 2005 Compass Box released a Blended Malt Scotch Whisky called The Spice Tree in which the blend of single malt distillates had undergone a secondary partial maturation stage in casks containing additional, flat French oak inserts (also known as ‘inner staves’). The Scotch Whisky Association, a trade organisation that represents the Scotch whisky industry, felt that the use of such inner staves in the whisky maturation process was in contravention of the Scotch Whisky Regulations prevailing at the time and threatened legal action against Compass Box if they did not halt production. In response, Compass Box altered the production process for subsequent releases, by having the secondary maturation stage take place in casks containing toasted French oak heads instead of the flat oak inner staves.

More recently, in 2015 Compass Box again disagreed with the Scotch Whisky Association when attempting to release complete information about every component whisky used in its blends, a step which the Scotch Whisky Association claimed was prohibited by both EU and UK laws. In response, Compass Box launched a 'Scotch Whisky Transparency' campaign to encourage greater transparency within the world of Scotch with other Scotch whisky producers – notably Bruichladdich – subsequently joined them in sharing full age component information about one or more of their blends.

Selected awards
 2020: The Spice Tree, Gold Winner, Blended Malt, World Whiskies Awards
 2020: The Peat Monster, Category Winner, No Age Statement, World Whiskies Awards
 2020: The Spice Tree, No Age Statement, Gold Winner, World Whiskies Awards
 2019: Great King Street, Gold, Blended Malt - Super Premium, The Scotch Whisky Masters 
 2018: Glasgow Blend, Gold, Blended: Premium, International Sprits Challenge
 2016: Flaming Heart. Scotch Vatted Malt of the Year, Jim Murray's Whisky Bible
 2015: The Spice Tree, Best Blended Malt Scotch Whisky, San Francisco World Spirits Championship
 2014: Delilah's, Most Innovative New Whisky of 2014, The Drammie Awards
 2014: The Peat Monster, Scotch Blended Malt of the Year, World Whiskies Awards
 2011: The Spice Tree, Winner of 'Best Scotch New Brand', Jim Murray's Whisky Bible 2011
 2011: Flaming Heart, Winner of 'Scotch Whisky Blend of the Year', Malt Advocate Whisky Awards
 2011: Flaming Heart (10th Anniversary bottling), Selected in Malt Advocate Whisky Awards 'Top Ten New Whiskies'
 2010: Gregg Glass, Shortlisted for 'Young Whisky Ambassador of the Year Icon', Whisky Magazine's Icons of Whisky Awards
 2010: The Peat Monster, Winner of 'Scotch Whisky Blend of the Year', Malt Advocate Whisky Awards
 2009: Hedonism, Winner of 'World's Best Grain Whisky', World Whiskies Awards
 2009: Hedonism, Category Winner of 'World's Best Blended Grain Whisky', World Whiskies Awards
 2008: The Peat Monster, Category Winner of 'World's Best Scotch Blended Malt', World Whiskies Awards
 2008: Hedonism, Winner of 'World's Best Grain Whisky', World Whiskies Awards
 2008: Morpheus, Sub-Category Winner of 'Scotch Blended Malt no age', World Whiskies Awards
 2007: Compass Box Whisky, Winner of 'Innovator of the Year', Whisky Magazine's Icons of Whisky Awards

References

External links
 http://compassboxwhisky.com/greatkingstreet/greatkingstreet.php

Companies based in the London Borough of Hounslow